Robert Daniel Murphy (October 28, 1894 – January 9, 1978) was an American diplomat. He served as the first United States Under Secretary of State for Political Affairs when the position was established during the Eisenhower administration.

Early life and career
Born in Milwaukee, Wisconsin, Murphy began his federal career at the United States Post Office (1916) and moved to be cipher clerk at the American Legation in Bern, Switzerland (1917). He was admitted to the US Foreign Service in 1921. Among the several posts that he held were Vice-Consul in Zürich and Munich, consul in Seville, consul in Paris from 1930 to 1936, and chargé d'affaires to the Vichy government. He was also the one-time State Department specialist on France.

World War II
In February 1941, Murphy negotiated the Murphy-Weygand Agreement, which allowed the United States to export to French North Africa in spite of the British blockade and trade restrictions against the Vichy-governed area.

In autumn of 1942, at President Franklin Roosevelt's behest, Murphy investigated conditions in French North Africa in preparation for the Allied landings, Operation Torch, the first major Western Allied ground offensive during World War II. He was appointed the President's personal representative with the rank of Minister to French North Africa. Murphy made contact with various French army officers in Algiers and recruited them to support the Allies when the invasion of French North Africa came. During this time, Kenneth Pendar served as his second.

Prior to the November 8 invasion, Murphy, along with U.S. General Mark W. Clark, had worked to gain the cooperation of French General Henri Giraud for the attack. The Americans and British hoped to place Giraud in charge of all French forces in North Africa and command them for the Allied cause. Giraud, however, mistakenly believed that he was to assume command of all Allied forces in North Africa, which put Murphy's diplomatic skills to the test to keep Giraud on board.

Murphy and Clark jointly convinced the French in North Africa to accept Admiral François Darlan, the commander of all French military Forces loyal to the Vichy regime and coincidentally in Algiers, as the highest authority in French North Africa and Giraud as Commander of all French military in North Africa. Murphy used his friendly contacts with the French in North Africa to gain their co-operation in re-entering the war against the Axis. He also needed all his diplomatic skills to steer Clark away from confrontation with the French, especially Darlan. When Darlan was assassinated in late December, an irritant to good relations was removed.

Keeping the French united and aligned with the Allies into 1943 taxed Murphy's skills to their limit. He gained a powerful ally in British politician (and future Prime Minister) Harold Macmillan, also posted to Algiers in January 1943. The two diplomats worked together amiably to ensure that the Casablanca Conference went smoothly in January 1943 and that Giraud and de Gaulle would join forces to unite the French among the Allies. Keeping the quarrelsome French united and working with the Americans and British exasperated and exhausted Murphy. When Eisenhower needed a civilian from the State Department to assume a similar role in Italy in 1943, Murphy gladly accepted it and left Algiers behind.

Later career
1948 advisor for General Lucius D. Clay, American military governor of American-occupied Germany, during the Soviet Russian Blockade of Berlin, and the Berlin Airlift, "Operation Vittles" 
1949 Ambassador Extraordinary and Plenipotentiary, Belgium
1952 Ambassador Extraordinary and Plenipotentiary, Japan (first American ambassador to Japan after World War II)
1953 Assistant Secretary for United Nations Affairs
1953 Deputy Under Secretary for Political Affairs (Assistant Secretary)
1955 Deputy Under Secretary for Political Affairs
1956 Career Ambassador
1958 Personal representative of President Dwight D. Eisenhower during the 1958 Lebanon crisis
1959 Under Secretary of State for Political Affairs

Later life
Murphy retired from the State Department in December 1959 but became an adviser to Presidents John F. Kennedy, Lyndon B. Johnson, and Richard Nixon. He served on President Gerald Ford's Foreign Intelligence Advisory Board.

He was a member of the Steering Committee of the Bilderberg Group.

In 2006, Murphy was featured on a United States postage stamp, one of a block of six featuring prominent diplomats.

Works 
 The Bases of Peace, [Washington] United States Department of State, 1958
 Diplomat among Warriors, [1st ed.], Garden City, N.Y., Doubleday, 1964.

References

Sources

External links

The Papers of Dwight David Eisenhower, Volume XX

Register of the Robert Daniel Murphy Papers, 1913-1978 and selected documents online at the Hoover Institution Archives, Stanford University. 

|-

|-

|-

|-

|-

1894 births
1978 deaths
Ambassadors of the United States to Belgium
Ambassadors of the United States to Japan
American expatriates in Switzerland
George Washington University Law School alumni
Laetare Medal recipients
Marquette University alumni
Members of the Steering Committee of the Bilderberg Group
Politicians from Milwaukee
Under Secretaries of State for Political Affairs
United States Assistant Secretaries of State
United States Career Ambassadors
United States Foreign Service personnel
American expatriates in Germany
Recipients of the President's Award for Distinguished Federal Civilian Service
20th-century American diplomats